Spain participated in the Eurovision Song Contest 2012 with the song "Quédate conmigo" written by Thomas G:son, Tony Sánchez-Ohlsson and Erik Bernholm. The song was performed by Pastora Soler, who was internally selected by the Spanish broadcaster Televisión Española (TVE) in December 2011 to represent Spain at the 2012 contest in Baku, Azerbaijan. The national final Eurovisión: Pastora Soler was organised in order to select the song Soler would perform. Three songs, one selected through an Internet public vote, competed in the televised show where an in-studio jury and a public televote selected "Quédate conmigo" as the winning song.

As a member of the "Big Five", Spain automatically qualified to compete in the final of the Eurovision Song Contest. Performing in position 19, Spain placed tenth out of the 26 participating countries with 97 points.

Background 

Prior to the 2012 contest, Spain had participated in the Eurovision Song Contest fifty-one times since its first entry in 1961. The nation has won the contest on two occasions: in 1968 with the song "La, la, la" performed by Massiel and in 1969 with the song "Vivo cantando" performed by Salomé, the latter having won in a four-way tie with France, the Netherlands and the United Kingdom. Spain has also finished second four times, with Karina in 1971, Mocedades in 1973, Betty Missiego in 1979 and Anabel Conde in 1995. In 2011, Spain placed twenty-third with the song "Que me quiten lo bailao" performed by Lucía Pérez.

The Spanish national broadcaster, Televisión Española (TVE), broadcasts the event within Spain and organises the selection process for the nation's entry. TVE confirmed their intentions to participate at the 2012 Eurovision Song Contest on 21 December 2012. Between 2007 and 2011, TVE organised a national final to select both the artist and song that would represent Spain. For their 2012 entry, the broadcaster opted to internally select the artist that would compete at the Eurovision Song Contest, while the song would be selected via a national final.

Before Eurovision

Artist selection 
On 21 December 2011, TVE announced during the morning show La mañana on La 1 that they had internally selected singer Pastora Soler to represent Spain in Baku. Other artists previously rumoured in the Spanish press to have been selected included Falete and Chenoa. During the show, it was revealed that a national final would select the song Soler would perform.

Eurovisión: Pastora Soler 
Eurovisión: Pastora Soler was the national final organised by TVE that took place on 3 March 2012 at Prado del Rey in Pozuelo de Alarcón, Community of Madrid, hosted by Anne Igartiburu. The show was broadcast on La 1, TVE Internacional as well as online via TVE's official website rtve.es. Three songs, one selected through an Internet round and the remaining two selected as pre-qualified songs, competed with the winner being decided upon through a combination of public televoting and an in-studio expert jury. The competing songs were selected from Soler's latest album Una mujer como yo and from new songs provided by her record label Warner Music Spain and composers who usually work with her.

Internet vote
One of the competing songs in the national final was selected through an Internet public vote. Two songs were revealed on 15 February 2012 via TVE's official website and users had until 20 February 2012 to vote for their favourite song and the winning song, "Ahora o nunca", qualified for the national final.

National final 
The televised final took place on 3 March 2012. All three participating songs were performed by Pastora Soler and the winning song, "Quédate conmigo", was selected through the combination of the votes of an in-studio jury (50%) and a public televote held between 22 February and 3 March 2012 (50%).

The three members of the in-studio jury that evaluated the songs during the final were:

 Óscar Gómez – Music producer, songwriter
 Sole Giménez – Singer-songwriter
 Franco de Vita – Singer-songwriter
In addition to the performances of the competing entries, guest performers included former Eurovision contestant Sergio Dalma which represented Spain in 1991, and singers David Bustamante and Malú.

Promotion 
To specifically promote "Quédate conmigo" as the Spanish Eurovision entry. On 21 April, Pastora Soler performed "Quédate conmigo" during the Eurovision in Concert event which was held at the Melkweg venue in Amsterdam, Netherlands and hosted by Ruth Jacott and Cornald Maas. In addition to her international appearances, she performed the song at an event which took place at the Auditorio Riberas Del Guadaira in Alcalá de Guadaíra, Seville, in order to present the songs from Una mujer como yo on the same day.

At Eurovision
According to Eurovision rules, all nations with the exceptions of the host country and the "Big Five" (France, Germany, Italy, Spain and the United Kingdom) are required to qualify from one of two semi-finals in order to compete for the final; the top ten countries from each semi-final progress to the final. As a member of the "Big Five", Spain automatically qualified to compete in the final on 26 May 2012. In addition to their participation in the final, Spain is also required to broadcast and vote in one of the two semi-finals. During the semi-final allocation draw on 25 January 2012, Spain was assigned to broadcast and vote in the first semi-final on 22 May 2012.

In Spain, the first semi-final was broadcast on La 2 and the final was broadcast on La 1 with commentary by José María Íñigo. This was the first time since 2008 that both semi-finals were not broadcast in Spain. The Spanish spokesperson, who announced the Spanish votes during the final, was Elena S. Sánchez. The broadcast of the final was watched by 6.542 million viewers in Spain with a market share of 43.5%. This represented an increase of 11.2% from the previous year with 1.818 million more viewers.

Final 
Pastora Soler took part in technical rehearsal 19 and 20 May, followed by dress rehearsals on 25 and 26 May. This included the jury final on 25 May where the professional juries of each country, responsible for 50 percent of each country's vote, watched and voted on the competing entries. The running order for the semi-finals and final was decided by through another draw on 20 March 2012, and as one of the five wildcard countries, Spain chose to perform in position 19, following the entry from Turkey and before the entry from Germany.

The Spanish performance featured Pastora Soler on stage wearing a white Hellenic-style chiffon dress designed by Spanish designer Cañavate, joined by five backing vocalists in black outfits. The stage lighting, predominantly dark at the beginning, transitioned to bright colours with clear lights, with the LED screens displaying light pink shapes alternating with a dark blue setting, which changed to a scene that resembled fireworks towards the end of the performance. The performance also featured the use of a wind machine. The five backing vocalists that joined Pastora Soler were Antonio Tomás Sepúlveda, Mey Green, Miguel Antelo, Rebeca Rods and Sheila Blanco. Spain placed tenth in the final, scoring 97 points.

Voting 
Voting during the three shows consisted of 50 percent public televoting and 50 percent from a jury deliberation. The jury consisted of five music industry professionals who were citizens of the country they represent. This jury was asked to judge each contestant based on: vocal capacity; the stage performance; the song's composition and originality; and the overall impression by the act. In addition, no member of a national jury could be related in any way to any of the competing acts in such a way that they cannot vote impartially and independently.

Following the release of the full split voting by the EBU after the conclusion of the competition, it was revealed that Spain had placed eighteenth with the public televote and fifth with the jury vote. In the public vote, Spain scored 45 points and in the jury vote the nation scored 154 points.

Below is a breakdown of points awarded to Spain and awarded by Spain in the first semi-final and grand final of the contest, and the breakdown of the jury voting and televoting conducted during the two shows:

Points awarded to Spain

Points awarded by Spain

References

External links
  RTVE's official Eurovision website

2012
Countries in the Eurovision Song Contest 2012
Eurovision
Eurovision